Hisiu is a coastal Village in the Central Province of Papua New Guinea. The village contains a primary school, two churches, a cemetery and several small local stores.
The Maeaka Tohana Language Project is based at Hisiu Village. This is a grassroots project to create the first public access knowledge book from the earliest records of the language and culture.

Climate
Hisiu has a tropical savanna climate (Aw) with heavy rainfall from December to March and moderate rainfall in the remaining months.

References

Populated places in Central Province (Papua New Guinea)